Palma del Río is a city located in the province of Córdoba, Spain. According to the 2006 census by the Instituto Nacional de Estadística, the city has a population of 20,640.

Agriculture

The region was intensively developed agriculturally during Arab rule, with advanced irrigation and water wheels. Some of the orange groves contain trees over 200 years old.

Notable people
Juan Rodríguez Cabrillo, a famous explorer of North America, believed to have been born in this town in 1497.
Luis Manuel Fernández de Portocarrero, archbishop of Toledo.
El Cordobés, matador.
Antonio José Sánchez Mazuecos, singer.

References

External links
Palma del Río - Sistema de Información Multiterritorial de Andalucía

Municipalities in the Province of Córdoba (Spain)